Papyrus Oxyrhynchus 234 (P. Oxy. 234 or P. Oxy. II 234) is a fragment of a treatise on medical prescriptions by an unknown author, written in Greek. It was discovered in Oxyrhynchus. The manuscript was written on papyrus in the form of a sheet. It is dated to the second or third century. Currently it is housed in the library of the University of St Andrews in Fife.

Description 
The document was written by an unknown copyist. The verso side contains the medical text. The measurements of the fragment are 306 by 87 mm. The text is written in a round upright medium-sized uncial hand. The recto side is written in an upright cursive hand and contains a memorandum concerning a lease.

It was discovered by Grenfell and Hunt in 1897 in Oxyrhynchus. The text was published by Grenfell and Hunt in 1899.

Text
Another:—Heat an equal quantity of beaver-musk and poppy-juice upon a potsherd, if possible one of Attic make, but failing that of...; soften by diluting with raisin wine, warm, and drop in.

Another:—Dilute some gum with balsam of lilies, and add honey and rose-extract.  Twist some wool with the oil in it round a probe, warm, and drop in.

Another:—Pound some closed calices of pomegranates, drop on saffron-water, and when it becomes discoloured draw the liquor off.  When required dilute as much as the bulk of a pea with raisin wine, warm, and drop in.

Clysters for the ear against earache:

Dilute frankincense with very sweet wine and syringe the ear; or use for this purpose the injections described above.

Another:—Rinse with warm onion-juice.

Another:—Syringe with gall of a bull or goat or sheep, or other similar kind of gall, warmed.

Another:—The sap of a pine tree, warmed, to be used in the same way.

See also 
 Oxyrhynchus Papyri
 Papyrus Oxyrhynchus 233
 Papyrus Oxyrhynchus 235

References 

234
2nd-century manuscripts
3rd-century manuscripts